Durazo is a surname. Notable people with the surname include:

Alfonso Durazo (born 1954), Mexican politician
Arturo Durazo Moreno (1924–2000), Mexican police chief
Erubiel Durazo (born 1975), Mexican baseball player
Maria Elena Durazo (born 1953), American politician